Đan Phượng may refer to several places in Vietnam, including:

 Đan Phượng District, a rural district of Hanoi
 , a rural commune of Đan Phượng District
 , a rural commune of Lâm Hà District